SSP is an abbreviation that may stand for:

Arts and entertainment
Silversun Pickups, an American alternative rock band
Super Sonic Power, a line of toys by Kenner Products in the 1970s

Companies
E. W. Scripps Company, stock symbol
SSP Group, British company

Economics and finance 
 Single Shared Platform, the basis of the TARGET2 real-time gross settlement system
 South Sudanese pound (by ISO code)
Statutory sick pay, in the United Kingdom

Government and politics

Political parties and organizations
Party of Freedom and Justice (Stranka slobode i pravde), a political party in Serbia
Samyukta Socialist Party, in India from 1964 to 1972
Scottish Socialist Party, founded in 1998
Sipah-e-Sahaba Pakistan

Other uses in government
Secretariat of Public Security, a federal ministry of the Mexican Executive Cabinet 
Ministry of Public Security (Mexico City)
Senior Superintendent of Police

Organizations
 Summer Science Program, an academic summer program
 Satellite Sentinel Project, to deter atrocities
 Scottish Society of Playwrights, a trade union
 Sigma Sigma Phi, an osteopathic medical honor society
 Society for Science & the Public
 Society for Scholarly Publishing
 Swiss Society of Physiology, see Life Sciences Switzerland

Places
 Sham Shui Po station, Hong Kong metro (by station code)

Science and technology

Biology and ecology
Shared Socioeconomic Pathways, for greenhouse gas scenarios
Species Survival Plan, to home endangered animals in a zoo
Subspecies, abbreviated ssp.

Computing and telecommunications
Sakura Script Player, for Ukagaka mascot software
Secure Simple Pairing, a Bluetooth pairing mechanism
Security Service Provider
Sender Signing Practices, later Author Domain Signing Practices for E-mail
Serial SCSI Protocol, for  SAS disk drives
Service switching point
Storage service provider
Supplementary Special-purpose Plane, in Unicode
System Service Processor
System Support Program, an IBM System/32 operating system
Synchronous Serial Port
Supply-side platform, for web advertising
Subset sum problem, an NP-complete decision problem
Six-state protocol, a quantum key distribution protocol

Medicine and psychology
Specialist in School Psychology
Swedish Universities Scales of Personality
Single Specific Primer, in SSP-PCR

Spaceflight
Space-based solar power
Space Studies Program, at the International Space University
Surface Science Package, part of the Huygens probe

Other uses in science and technology
Sardar Sarovar Project, dam project in India
Sonority Sequencing Principle, in linguistics

Other uses
Volkswagen Group Scalable Systems Platform, a car platform
Special Service Package, for North American police vehicles
Specialist schools programme, educational programme in the United Kingdom
Sungai Buloh-Serdang-Putrajaya MRT Line, a rapid transit line in Malaysia
Needle and syringe programmes, also known as Syringe Service Programs (SSP)